Joseph B. Lott was a state legislator in Louisiana. He served in the Louisiana House of Representatives. Harry Lott 
also represented the Parish.

He gave testimony in 1873 that the registrar of Rapides Parish refused to register African American voters.

Moved to Texas?

References

Year of birth missing
Members of the Louisiana House of Representatives
People from Rapides Parish, Louisiana
Year of birth unknown
Place of birth unknown
Place of death unknown
Year of death unknown